The 1981 Scotland rugby union tour of New Zealand was a series of eight matches played by the Scotland national rugby union team in New Zealand in May and June 1981. The Scotland team won five of their matches and lost the other three. They lost both international matches against the New Zealand national rugby union team (the All Blacks).

Matches 
Scores and results list Scotland's points tally first.

Touring party

Manager: Ken Smith
Assistant Manager: Jim Telfer
Captain: Andy Irvine

Backs

Andy Irvine
Peter Dods
Steve Munro
Bruce Hay
Roger Baird
Richard Breakey
Alastair Cranston
Jim Renwick
John Rutherford
Ron Wilson
Roy Laidlaw
Gordon Hunter
Alan Lawson replacement during tour

Forwards

Derek White
Iain Paxton
Peter Lillington
Jim Calder
Gordon Dickson
David Leslie
Bill Cuthbertson
Tom Smith
Alan Tomes
Jim Aitken
Gerry McGuinness
Iain Milne
Norrie Rowan
Colin Deans
Kenneth Lawrie

References

Scotland rugby union tour
Scotland national rugby union team tours
Rugby union tours of New Zealand
Scottish-New Zealand culture
tour
tour